"Bury Her Next to Jasper's Leg" is the sixth episode of the sixth season of the post-apocalyptic horror television series Fear the Walking Dead, which aired on AMC on November 15, 2020, in the United States.

Plot 
June and Sarah are now running a mobile clinic, but they aren't having much success in saving people, including the death of a man from a burst appendix that they tried to operate on. June is reunited with John, who tries to convince her to flee to his cabin with him, but they are interrupted by a message from Luciana about a disaster in Tank Town due to the explosion of a new well.

Virginia, John, June, Sarah, Luciana and the Pioneers fight to save survivors of the disaster, but a spray-painted message that reads "THE END IS THE BEGINNING" convinces Virginia that it was not an accident. Upon realizing and finding the art supplies of an injured Wes, Virginia tortures him for answers, believing he is responsible before being taken away by June.

However, June and Virginia get caught in an explosion, and Virginia gets attacked by a walker who manages to bite her hand. June hesitates to amputate her hand, blaming Virginia for the deaths of the workers, but Virginia insists there is a greater threat than her and that her methods are oriented to protect the people of her communities. June decides to save Virginia, who agrees to give June her own hospital. Tank Town is destroyed, and as a consequence, June refuses to leave with John and instead intends to build her hospital with the help of Luciana, Sarah, Wes, and Wendell. Though devastated by June's choice, John decides to implement his escape plan on his own.

Reception 
"Bury Her Next To Jasper's Leg" received mixed reviews. David S.E. Zapanta from Den of Geek! gave it a negative rating of 2 out of 5 ratings and wrote: "What is there to say really about this week's Fear the Walking Dead? After a strong run of episodes that stumbled with last week’s 'Honey', season 6 completely face plants with 'Bury Her Next to Jasper’s Leg.' If I were John Dorie, I’d cut and run back to a lakeside cabin, too. But it didn't have to be this way." Emily Hannemann from TV Insider gave it a rating of 2.5 out of 5 ratings, and also gave the episode a negative review in the process, writing: "This episode was suspenseful and had some great character moments for June, but it’s hard to move past all the ways it goes against the rules of the universe in which these shows take place. That, combined with John’s weird decision, makes this the lowest-rated episode of the season for me." Paul Daily writing for TV Fanatic gave it a rating of 4.75 out of 5 ratings, and wrote: "Fear the Walking Dead Season 6 Episode 6 was a pulse-pounding installment that featured several misdirects, tense zombie battles, and a lot of payoff to some big storylines."

Ratings 
The episode was seen by 1.27 million viewers in the United States on its original air date, above the previous episodes.

References

External links

 "Bury Her Next to Jasper's Leg" at AMC.com
 

2020 American television episodes
Fear the Walking Dead (season 6) episodes